Fruit of the poisonous tree is a legal metaphor used to describe evidence that is obtained illegally. The logic of the terminology is that if the source (the "tree") of the evidence or evidence itself is tainted, then anything gained (the "fruit") from it is tainted as well.

United States
The doctrine underlying the name was first described in Silverthorne Lumber Co. v. United States, 251 U.S. 385 (1920).  The term's first use was by Justice Felix Frankfurter in Nardone v. United States (1939).

Such evidence is not generally admissible in court. For example, suppose a police officer obtained a key to a train station locker in the process of conducting a search of a home that was unconstitutional on the grounds that it violated the Fourth Amendment. Any evidence of a crime that came from that locker would most likely be excluded under the "fruit of the poisonous tree" legal doctrine. The testimony of a witness who is discovered through illegal means would not necessarily be excluded, however, due to the "attenuation doctrine", which allows certain evidence or testimony to be admitted in court if the link between the illegal police conduct and the resulting evidence or testimony is sufficiently attenuated.  For example, a witness who freely and voluntarily testifies is enough of an independent intervening factor to sufficiently "attenuate" the connection between the government's illegal discovery of the witness and the witness's voluntary testimony itself.  (United States v. Ceccolini, 435 U.S. 268 (1978))

The "fruit of the poisonous tree" doctrine is an extension of the exclusionary rule, which, subject to some exceptions, prevents evidence obtained in violation of the Fourth Amendment from being admitted in a criminal trial. Like the exclusionary rule, the fruit of the poisonous tree doctrine is intended to deter police from using illegal means to obtain evidence.

The doctrine is subject to four main exceptions.  The tainted evidence is admissible if:
 it was discovered in part as a result of an independent, untainted source; or
 it would inevitably have been discovered despite the tainted source; or
 the chain of causation between the illegal action and the tainted evidence is too attenuated; or
 the search warrant was not found to be valid based on probable cause, but was executed by government agents in good faith (called the good-faith exception).

Similar doctrines in Europe
This doctrine was also used by the European Court of Human Rights in Gäfgen v. Germany   In certain cases continental European countries have similar laws (e.g. in cases of torture), while the doctrine itself is generally not known.
In the UK however, fruit of the poisonous tree doctrine is not recognized, as illegally obtained evidence is admissible in a court of law.

Contrasting doctrine
The admissibility of evidence obtained by unlawful means has been a point of contention in courts throughout the world. Examples would include stolen documents or tapped phones.
Illegally obtained evidence is used by the courts to ensure that the judgement is factually correct, however the person obtaining the illegal evidence typically faces independent consequences.

India
English courts have relied on an 1861 verdict, R v Leathem, to admit evidence irrespective of the legality of the source. This is the general stance.

Drawing on the English tradition, the doctrine does not have a parallel in India and courts will admit evidence, even if it is illegally obtained (stolen, etc.), especially if it will help prove guilt or innocence. While the quality of the evidence may be suspect, the position that the evidence should not be considered at all is not a position Indian courts take.

There are other considerations as to the admissibility of the evidence, such as whether it was extracted under duress or other violation of human rights including privacy in modern times, or "if its prejudicial effect on the jury was likely to outweigh its probative value". However, this article deals only about cognisance in case the source of the evidence itself may be unlawful.

The Supreme Court of India, the highest appellate and constitutional court of India, has dealt with the matter multiple times, decisively so in 1971, ruling against the applicability of this doctrine in India.

In the 2019 Rafale deal controversy, the Attorney General K. K. Venugopal argued in front of a three-member bench of the court, which included the sitting Chief Justice, that official, classified documents stolen from the government – which happened to be integral to the case in question – should not be taken cognisance of by the court, as they were classified, and the stealth and subsequent leakage to a newspaper was a crime under the Official Secrets Act. K M Joseph, from the bench, noted that "even stolen evidence can be looked into by the Court. It is well settled under Evidence Act", while the Chief Justice, Ranjan Gogoi, queried whether it would be correct for the court to ignore the claim of an alibi (of an accused) if it were based on stolen evidence. The third constituent of the bench, Sanjay Kaul, further noted that even if the Attorney General's argument were correct, any evidence would be admissible if it would shock the conscience of the court.

Admissibility of evidence in Indian courts hinges primarily on relevance and then on the source. The Supreme Court, especially, is empowered by the Constitution of India to have any document produced before it. In fact, in the 1971 verdict touched upon above, the Supreme Court decision relies on R v Leathem (1861).

However, considerations of protection against self-incrimination – a right guaranteed by the Constitution – are taken into account and evidence obtained under duress will be grounds to reject its validity, but not the legality of the source alone.

Ireland
In Ireland the only absolute prohibition on admitting illegally-obtained evidence is where the evidence was knowingly obtained in breach of constitutional rights. Evidence obtained in breach of constitutional rights where this breach was inadvertent, or where it was illegal but not in breach of constitutional rights, may be admitted.

Sweden
The judicial system in Sweden follows a principle of "fri bevisprövning", i.e. "", where all sides may announce and use any and all evidence it wants, regardless of the source or how it was obtained. It is then up to the court to evaluate the evidence via the principle of "free evaluation of evidence", "Fri bevisvärdering". If a crime was committed when acquiring the evidence it may still be used in the trial and the one committing the crime may still be tried later for the crime. At the same time the court may take the crime into consideration when evaluating the value and impact of the evidence.

See also
 Commonwealth v. Matos
 Silverthorne Lumber Co. v. United States
 Mapp v. Ohio, 
 Wong Sun v. United States, 
 Nix v. Williams, 
 
 Parallel construction
 Sugar bowl (legal maxim)
 Section 24(2) of the Canadian Charter of Rights and Freedoms

References

Legal doctrines and principles
American legal terminology
English-language idioms